Teogenes Pelegrino (born 3 January 1949) is a Filipino boxer born in Bohol. He competed in the men's featherweight event at the 1968 Summer Olympics where he was the only competitor who managed to win a match among five Filipino boxers competing that iteration of the games. At the 1968 Summer Olympics, he defeated Fantahun Seifu of Ethiopia, before losing to Al Robinson of the United States.

References

External links
 

1949 births
Living people
Filipino male boxers
Olympic boxers of the Philippines
Boxers at the 1968 Summer Olympics
Sportspeople from Bohol
Featherweight boxers
21st-century Filipino people